José Manuel Corral García (born 8 December 1952) is a Spanish former football player and manager.

Corral's playing career as a midfielder included 23 appearances and one goal during two La Liga seasons with Almería. He had a brief spell as manager of Deportivo La Coruña in the top flight during the 1997–98 season.

Playing career

Corral was born in A Coruña in Galicia, but began his career with Spanish giants Barcelona. He played with their B team, Barcelona Atlètic, in the Tercera División in 1971–72, but left at the end of that season without appearing for the first team. He joined Segunda División side San Andrés, spending an uneventful season before dropping back to the Tercera División with Racing de Ferrol in 1973. Ferrol were promoted to Segunda División B in 1976–77, and followed this up by winning their group and earning a second consecutive promotion the following season. 1978–79 proved to be their only season in the second tier, as they were relegated at the first attempt, and Corral left the club that summer.

Corral then joined newly promoted La Liga side Almería, and made 23 top flight appearances over the next two seasons. Almería were relegated in 1980–81, and Corral left professional football at the age of just 28.

Coaching career

After his retirement, Corral returned to his home town, becoming a coach at Deportivo La Coruña. By the mid-1990s, he was assistant to first team coach John Toshack, and after Toshack's resignation in February 1997, Corral was appointed caretaker manager. He was in charge for one match, which was a goalless draw against Atlético Madrid on 16 February, before the arrival of new head coach Carlos Alberto Silva.

Silva too was sacked in October the same year, following poor results in La Liga and elimination from the UEFA Cup at the hands of French side Auxerre. Corral was again put in charge, this time in a more permanent capacity until the end of the season. Depor won just thirteen of Corral's 36 matches in charge, and finished the season in 12th place, their lowest finish since 1991–92. He was replaced by Javier Irureta ahead of the following season, heralding the start of the most successful period in the club's history.

Honours

Player
Racing de Ferrol
Segunda División B: 1977–78

Career statistics

As a player

As a manager

References

External links

1952 births
Living people
Spanish footballers
Footballers from A Coruña
Association football midfielders
La Liga players
Segunda División players
Segunda División B players
Tercera División players
FC Barcelona Atlètic players
UE Sant Andreu footballers
Racing de Ferrol footballers
AD Almería footballers
Spanish football managers
La Liga managers
Deportivo de La Coruña managers